Alexander Anatolyevich Shabalov (born September 12, 1967) is an American chess grandmaster and a four-time winner of the United States Chess Championship (1993, 2000, 2003, 2007). He also won or tied for first place seven times in the U.S. Open Chess Championship (1993, 1999, 2003, 2007, 2008, 2015, 2016).

Shabalov was born in Riga, Latvia, and was known during much of his career for courting complications even at the cost of objective soundness, much like his fellow Latvians Mikhail Tal and Alexei Shirov. He has transitioned to a more conservative and positional playing style as of 2019.

In 2002 he tied for first place at the Aeroflot Open in Moscow with Gregory Kaidanov, Alexander Grischuk, Aleksej Aleksandrov, and Vadim Milov.
In 2009 Shabalov shared first place with Fidel Corrales Jimenez in the American Continental Chess Championship.

Shabalov regularly lectured chess players of all ages at the House of Chess, a store he ran at Ross Park Mall in Pittsburgh, Pennsylvania, until it closed in mid-2007.

In 2015 he was inducted into the U.S. Chess Hall of Fame.

In 2019, Shabalov won the 23rd annual Eastern Chess Congress.

In 2020, Shabalov won the 52nd annual Liberty Bell Open.

Shabalov won the 2022 U.S. Senior Championship, defeating Grandmaster Larry Christiansen in the final round of the tournament to claim victory.

Notable games
Alexey Shirov vs Alexander Shabalov, Rapidplay 2001, Spanish Game: Schliemann Defense, Dyckhoff Variation (C63), 0-1
Alexander Shabalov vs Varuzhan Akobian, US Championships  2003 2003, French Defense: Advance, Lputian Variation (C02), 1-0
Alexander Shabalov vs John Fedorowicz, US Championships  2003 2003, Benko Gambit: Accepted, Pawn Return Variation (A57), 1-0

References

External links

 
 
 
 
 
 

1967 births
Living people
Chess grandmasters
Chess Olympiad competitors
American chess players
Latvian chess players
Sportspeople from Riga
Russians in Latvia